Lake Razelm or Lake Razim (Limanul Razelm) is the name of a large freshwater lagoon on the shores of the Black Sea in Romania, south of the Danube Delta and part of its World Heritage Site. It is the largest liman in Romania.

The name is also sometimes applied to the complex it forms with several other limans and lagoons. This complex can be separated into two subgroups. All these lakes cover an area of about 1000 km², 400 km² of it being the area of Lake Razelm alone.

Ecology
When the Razelm/Golovița system was closed off from the sea in the late 1970s, this resulted in several changes to the ecological conditions of the system, including an decrease in salinity to almost zero, an increase in refreshment time to over a year, and episodes of eutrophication. Despite this environmental degradation, the system remains an important habitat. Three families of cockles could be found in Romania in the 1960s, and the two that remain are found only in Razelm (albeit at reduced densities). Popina Island at the north end of the lake is an important refuge for many bird species and invertebrates. The recent ecological study suggests that the Razim-Sinoie lagoon system is close to the good ecological status according to the requirements of the Water Framework Directive.

References

Lakes of Romania
Saline lakes of Europe
Geography of Tulcea County
Lagoons of Romania
Lagoons of the Black Sea